"Today" is a song recorded by American country music artist Brad Paisley. It was released on October 6, 2016, by Arista Nashville as the first single from his eleventh studio album, Love and War. Paisley co-wrote the song with Chris DuBois and Ashley Gorley, and co-produced it with Luke Wooten.

Commercial performance
"Today" gave Paisley his first number one on the Billboard Country Digital Song sales chart. It accumulated 41,000 downloads in its debut week and after its first full week, jumped from number 49 to 12 on the Hot Country Songs chart, with 1.1 million first-week streams and an airplay audience of 3.9 million. The song has sold 151,000 copies as of March 2017.

Usage in other media
The song was featured in Comedy Central animated series South Park episode "Buddha Box".

Music video
The music video was directed by Paisley and Jim Shea and premiered in October 2016. The emotional video quickly went viral after its release and has been viewed over 25 million times during the first week with over ½ million shares on Facebook.

The video focuses on the song's central idea of a happy memory being enough to sustain one through the hard times.

Charts

Weekly charts

Year-end charts

Certifications

References

External links
 

2016 songs
2016 singles
Country ballads
2010s ballads
Brad Paisley songs
Songs written by Brad Paisley
Songs written by Chris DuBois
Songs written by Ashley Gorley
Arista Nashville singles